U-571 may refer to:

 , a German submarine during World War II
 U-571 (film), a fictional war film, about a submarine, released in 2000